ONUCA and ONUSAL were two United Nations peacekeeping missions deployed in Central America during the late 1980s and early 1990s.

ONUCA

The United Nations Security Council formally created ONUCA  ("United Nations Observer Group in Central America") when it approved Resolution 644 on 7 November 1989. The 625-person group, located in 33 regional bases, was responsible for halting cross-border infiltration and cutting support for rebels in the Central American region, and consisted of 260 unarmed military observers along with supporting technicians. Hemisphere countries involved in ONUCA included Spain, Sweden, Ireland, India, Venezuela, Canada, Argentina, Brazil, Ecuador and Colombia.
ONUCA's initial mandate, composition and operational concept reflected the UN reluctance to get involved in internal conflicts. It was to be a verification and peace-observing mission, not a full-scale peacekeeping interposition mission, and certainly not peace-enforcement, although as events unfolded there were brief periods when Contra reluctance to disband threatened to convert ONUCA's role to one of enforcement. The scope of the operation was briefly moved up the conflict resolution spectrum for the period of Contra demobilization, but the UN consistently defined ONUCA's mission as a verification one. This limited definition of ONUCA's role was also a reflection of the Latin American resistance to peacekeeping, and their preference for smaller observation missions with the lowest possible military profile. The Canadians, who were used to larger peacekeeping missions, frequently called ONUCA a “minimalist” operation, noting that it would have difficulty verifying the Esquipulas Agreement in the large geographic area assigned to it.

In early 1990 the Contras were showing considerable reluctance to disband. This was due in part to the lack of control on the part of the fragmented Contra leadership, as well as the very real fears among the Contras that if they disbanded and gave up their weapons they would be at the mercy of the Sandinista military. Although diplomats on all sides pressured the Contras, the hard line being taken on the Contras was undermined by the reality that 260 unarmed UN observers were not going to force the Contras to do anything. And so, setting aside their historical aversion to peace-enforcement, the Security Council decided to expand ONUCA's mandate and temporarily give it some combat power: a battalion of paratroopers with their basic weapons. On 15 March 1990 the UN Secretary-General asked the Security Council, on an urgent basis, that ONUCA be expanded from its 260 observers to add 116 more for observation plus an armed infantry battalion of at least four rifle companies (about 800 troops) for supervision of Contra demobilization. Venezuela, which already was providing observers to ONUCA, had agreed to provide this battalion. Although the Secretary-General's Report did not say that the demobilization would be forced, there was a clear implication that adding armed paratroopers to the unarmed UN military observers would be a powerful message to the reluctant Contras.

The demobilization process did not officially end until 5 July when the last elements of the Venezuelan Battalion returned home. Exact figures on the number demobilized were somewhat questionable, but there were approximately 23,000 Contras processed, and close to 17,000 weapons recovered and destroyed. With the demobilization of the Contras completed in early July, the ONUCA mandate reverted to the original rather limited one of concentrating on the borders and watching for violations of the Esquipulas II prohibition on cross-border support of irregular forces.

In November 1990 the Security Council accepted the Secretary-General's recommendation that because of its reduced mission, the size of ONUCA could be cut back somewhat. The Council also extended the mandate for six months (twice, to November 1991), and agreed that its main focus would be to maintain a UN presence in the region as a confidence-building measure, and in order to deter cross-border support for insurgencies. In effect, ONUCA was now becoming a token and "flag-showing" presence waiting for a possible expanded mandate if the situation in El Salvador should lead to an agreement requiring UN verification. It was terminated in Resolution 730 with effect on January 17, 1992, with some of the forces joining ONUSAL.

ONUSAL and the Salvadoran peace process
The situation in El Salvador in 1990–1991 was characterized by a continuing civil war and hopes for peace that culminated in intense UN-sponsored talks. These achieved a cease-fire agreement in a December 1991 New Year's Eve "Act of New York" which expanded the original ONUSAL ("United Nations Observer Group in El Salvador") established Security Council Resolution 693, whose limited mission was restricted to monitoring human rights, and converted it into a new major UN verification and observation mission. Contra demobilization in Nicaragua provided a useful precedent for FMLN demobilization in El Salvador. With the expanded ONUSAL came the end of the now much-diminished ONUCA, whose personnel and assets were quickly moved to El Salvador in January 1992.

ONUSAL differed from ONUCA in one key respect: the police function. A key element in the Salvadoran peace process was that demobilization of the FMLN would be accompanied by demobilization of certain military and police units which had been associated with some of the more brutal human rights violations of the ten-year civil war. To replace the old security and police forces there would be a new National Police which would include personnel from both the old police and the FMLN. These personnel had to be trained quickly, and this was the function of the "Police Division" of ONUSAL, which included officers from Chile, Mexico and Guyana, as well as several European countries. ONUSAL military observers in the "Military Division" included officers from Spain, Brazil, Canada, Colombia, Ecuador, Ireland, Sweden, India and Venezuela; Argentina provided medical officers and Argentine Navy's patrol boats. The relative activity of the various divisions of ONUSAL can be seen from their authorized strengths: the Human Rights Division included approximately 50 observers, legal advisors and educators; the Military Division was authorized 249, with an additional 88 observers deployed for the critical "separation of forces" period in early 1992; the Police Division, by far the largest, was provided with 631 personnel.

Although there were problems and delays in the original schedule worked out in the December 1991 New York and January 1992 Mexico City agreements, the process was eventually successful, thanks in no small part to the ONUSAL presence. From February until 15 December 1992 the FMLN was concentrated into 15 camps under ONUSAL supervision, where they slowly demobilized and turned in their weapons for disposition by ONUSAL. Simultaneously, key units of the Salvadoran armed forces also demobilized and officers identified with human rights violations were purged from the military. At the same time the old Salvadoran National Guard and the Treasury Police were dissolved and the new "Policía Nacional Civil" (PNC) was created under a crash training program supervised by the Police Division of ONUSAL. The process was not without its difficulties, and elements in the regular Salvadoran police and military, supported by right-wing political elements, resisted the process.

ONUSAL was terminated in Security Council Resolution 991 in April 1995.

References

Child, Jack. The Central American Peace Process, 1983–1991, Boulder: Lynne Rienner, 1992.
International Peace Academy. Conflict in Central America: Approaches to Peace and Security, NY: St Martin's, 1986.
Montgomery, Tommie Sue, ed. Peacemaking and Democratization in Central America, Boulder, CO: Lynne Rienner, 1999.
Rikhye, Indar Jit, The Theory and Practice of Peacekeeping. London: C. Hurst, 1984.   
United Nations. The Blue Helmets, (NY: United Nations, 1996), pp. 393–6.

Politics of Central America
United Nations operations in North America
United Nations operations in Central America
History of Nicaragua
Human rights in El Salvador
Salvadoran Civil War
Non-combat military operations involving India
Nicaragua and the United Nations
El Salvador and the United Nations